Heteroponera georgesi is a species of ant in the genus Heteroponera. Endemic to French Guiana,  it was described by Perrault in 1999.

References

Heteroponerinae
Hymenoptera of South America
Insects described in 1999